Putrajaya Hospital is a Malaysian government-owned public hospital in the administrative region of Putrajaya. Originally founded in 1998, this hospital has 369 beds. As a hospital located in the Multimedia Super Corridor, it has managed and maintained the hospital using the Full Hospital Information System ("Total Hospital Information System - T.H.I.S.").

History 
The hospital was first built in 1998 at a cost of RM283 million and operated in stages on 1 November 2000. Originally HPj only had 278 beds and has increased to 341 beds in 2012 with the establishment of a Low Risk Maternity Center in Precinct 8 and is now operational with 369 official beds starting January 2018.

Future developments 
The Malaysian government has awarded engineering firm George Kent (M) Berhad a RM364.9 million contract to complete an endocrine extension to Putrajaya Hospital. Putrajaya Hospital is the tertiary referral centre for endocrine diseases, which include diabetes and hormonal disorders.

Achievement 
Putrajaya Hospital is also one of the hospitals accredited by the Malaysian Society for Quality in Health (MSQH).

Notable patients 
 Abdul Hadi Awang – Malaysian politician
 Kento Momota – Japanese badminton player 
 Kim Jong Nam – Son of North Korean leader Kim Jong-il
 Sivasangari Subramaniam - Malaysian professional squash player
 Wee Ka Siong – Malaysian politician

Notable staff 
 Noor Hisham Abdullah – Endocrine surgeon

See also
 Healthcare in Malaysia

References

External links 

 Putrajaya Hospital

Buildings and structures in Putrajaya
Hospitals in Malaysia
Hospitals established in 1998